Trygve Thue (21 June 1950 – 14 April 2022) was a Norwegian guitarist and music producer, and an original member of the Norwegian band . He was the brother of the folk singer .

Career 
Thue was born in Bergen and received his first musical accolades with "Freeze on His Back" in the boys choir Folkeskolens Guttekor in 1958 in Bergen. His background as choir boy often gave him a competitive advantage in polyphonic singing and instrumental harmonies, a result of his many hours in the studio making albums such as Jan Eggum's "En Natt Forbi" and "Bare Nerver" in which he both wrote and sang the voices in the choir.

From 1976 and onwards he ran his own studio, Bergen Lydstudio, where he produced records for artists like Bjørn Eidsvåg, Jan Eggum, Johannes Kleppevik, Nurk Twins, Hole in the Wall, Cactus, Ivar Medaas, Sissel Kyrkjebø, Knutsen & Ludvigsen, Gustav Lorentzen, Lollipop, Ole Paus, Bergen Blues Band, Rolv Wesenlund and Harald Heide-Steen Jr., Ole Amund Gjersvik, Mads Eriksen, Rune Larsen and Fabel . In addition, he recorded the Magna Carta album Live in Bergen 1978, and around 200 other albums.

Discography (a selection) 

Solo albums

 1975: Brødrene Thue (RCA Victor)
 1994: Jeg – En Beach Boy (Tylden & Co)

Collaborations

Within Saft
 1971: Saft (Polydor Records)
 1971: Horn (Polydor Records)
 1973: Stev, Sull, Rock & Rull (Philips Records)

Within Hole in the Wall
 1972: Hole in the Wall (Sonet Records)

With Jan Eggum
 1975: Jan Eggum (CBS Records)
 1976: Trubadur (CBS Records)

Within The Lollipops 
 1989: Lollipop (Mariann Records), with Rune Larsen and Tor Endresen
 1990: Lollipop 2 (Mariann Records), with Rune Larsen, Tor Endresen and Karoline Krüger
 1991: Lollipop Jukebox (Lollipop Records)

Within Bergen Blues Band
 2010: The Best of Bergen Blues Band (Hungry Records)

References

External links 
 Jeg En Beach Boy
 «Brødrene Thue» on MIC.no
 
 

1950 births
2022 deaths
Musicians from Bergen
Norwegian male guitarists
Norwegian male composers
20th-century Norwegian guitarists
20th-century Norwegian composers
20th-century Norwegian male musicians
21st-century Norwegian guitarists
21st-century Norwegian composers
21st-century Norwegian male musicians